Salvatore Laudani (9 December 1947 – 22 January 2020) was an Italian weightlifter. He competed in the men's middleweight event at the 1972 Summer Olympics.

References

1947 births
2020 deaths
Italian male weightlifters
Olympic weightlifters of Italy
Weightlifters at the 1972 Summer Olympics
Sportspeople from Catania
20th-century Italian people